(1790–1870), often called  is a semi-legendary martial artist in Ryūkyūan history who was a direct influence on the development of karate and kobudo, especially with respect to bōjutsu.  is social class of the Ryūkyū Kingdom. A resident of the island of Hama Higa, he was perhaps a student of the Chinese emissaries Zhang Xue Li and later Wanshu, who would have taught him techniques of quan fa.

Ryūkyūan history relied mainly on oral tradition prior to the 20th century, so it is difficult to separate fact and fiction (or embellishment). Legends state that Higa with his bō stood up to the head-hunters of Formosa and to Japanese pirates from the north and never lost a battle.
 
What has turned out to be a big misunderstanding, however, is that Higa was the teacher of Takahara Peechin, who in turn taught Sakugawa Kanga. 
Takahara Peechin (1683-1760) died 30 years before Higa(1790-1870) was born. 
Higa was one of the first to codify a system of kata and techniques. His contributions live on in several weapon katas, especially for tonfa, sai, and bō.

In a book of Taira Shinken: Ryukyu Kobudo Taikan, (published in Tokyo 1964) it is written about a man, Pechin from the island Hama Higa. He lived from 1663 to 1738 and demonstrated Tode and Saijutsu to the 5th Tokugawa shogun.

See also
 Pechin

References 

 Birth of Martial Arts with Weaponry and Lineage at Okinawa Prefectural Government Karate and Martial Arts with Weaponry
 Machu Higa (1790 - 1870) from Legacy Shorin Ryu
 Machu Higa was the Sensei of Takahara Peichin who taught Karate Sakugawa (1733-1815) at hasudojo.ca

Okinawan male karateka
1790 births
1870 deaths
Ryukyuan people